The Civil Aviation Authority of Sri Lanka (CAASL) (Sinhala: සිවිල් ගුවන්සේවා අධිකාරිය Sivil Guwanseva Adhikariya) oversees the government approval and regulation of civil aviation matters for the nation of Sri Lanka. Its head office is in Katunayake as of 1 February 2018.

History
Its head office was formerly in Colombo.

Units
The Aircraft Accident Investigation Unit investigates aircraft accidents and incidents in Sri Lanka.

References

External links

 Flight Information Region In Sri Lanka
 Civil Aviation Authority of Sri Lanka
2013 contact information (Archive)

Sri Lanka
Government of Sri Lanka
Aviation organisations based in Sri Lanka
Organizations investigating aviation accidents and incidents
Civil aviation in Sri Lanka